The Philippines is archipelagic country in Southeast Asia, located in the northwest Pacific Ocean. It consists of 7,641 islands. The country is known to be "the most exposed country in the world to tropical storms", with about twenty tropical cyclones entering the Philippine area of responsibility each year. In the Philippine languages, tropical cyclones are generally called bagyo.

Climatologically, in the Northwest Pacific basin, most tropical cyclones develop between May and October. However, the Philippines can experience a tropical cyclone anytime in the year, with the most storms during the months of June to September. This article includes any tropical cyclone of any intensity that affected the Philippines between 1963 and 1999.

1963–1969

1963 
June 9–10, 1963: Tropical Storm Rose (Bebeng) closes in the northwestern coast of Luzon, bringing rainfall.
June 26–28, 1963: Typhoon Trix (Diding) traverses Luzon.
July 19, 1963: Typhoon Agnes (Ising) made landfall over the northern portion of Cagayan.
August 13–15, 1963Typhoon Carmen (Luding) impacts most of Luzon as a Category 4 typhoon.
September 7, 1963Typhoon Faye (Neneng) passes over the extreme Northern islands of the country.
December 12–13, 1963Tropical Storm Phyllis (Sisang) affects the western coast of the country.
December 15–16, 1963Tropical Storm Rita (Trining) and its outflow affects the eastern portion of the country.

1964 
June 29–30, 1964: Typhoon Winnie (Dading) passes over Southern Luzon and Metro Manila, with Manila experiencing the worst typhoon since 1882. Approximately 500,000 people were rendered homeless in the Manila area and in the central provinces of Luzon following the razing of thousands of homes; 10 people were killed by flooding in the capital. This was the first time PAGASA retired a typhoon name afterwards.
July 9, 1964: Tropical Storm Cora (Huaning) nears Samar before dissipating. Storm warnings were issued in southeastern Luzon with Cora 100 km (60 mi) east of Samar, with forecasts projecting stormy conditions in the region and in other islands in the east-central Philippines.
July 17, 1964: Typhoon Elsie (Lusing) batters Luzon, causing extensive flooding in Manila.
August 6–7, 1964: Typhoon Ida (Seniang) impacts Northern Luzon as a strong typhoon. Streets in Manila were flooded to waist-height from heavy rains and hgh waves.
September 3, 1964: Typhoon Ruby (Yoning) prompted the PAGASA to issue storm warnings over northern Luzon, Batanes and the Babuyan Group of Islands.
September 9, 1964: Typhoon Sally (Aring) passes by over the northern islands of Luzon with winds of 114 km/h (71 mph) being recorded there. PAGASA raised only a Tropical Cyclone Signal No. 2 there.
September 28–29, 1964: Tropical Storm Billie (Kayang) caused severe flooding over the Bicol Region and Manila. 16 people were killed in Camarines Sur.
October 5, 1964: Typhoon Clara (Dorang) made landfall over Auror province.
October 8–9, 1964: Typhoon Dot (Enang) traverses the Cagayan and Ilocos regions.
October 20–21, 1964: Tropical Storm Georgia (Grasing) made landfall over Quezon province.
November 19–20, 1964: Typhoon Louise (Ining) made landfall over Surigao del Sur as a powerful typhoon, impacting Mindanao and much of Visayas.
November 21–23, 1964: As a continuation of Typhoon Louise, Tropical Storm Marge (Liling) moved through Luzon only as a much more weaker system. Typhoon Louise–Marge killed at least 577 people in total.
November 27–28, 1964: Tropical Storm Nora (Moning) moved eastward and affected Visayas and Calabarzon.
December 13–14, 1964: Typhoon Opal (Naning) affected much of Luzon as a strong typhoon, killing 26 people.

1970s 

1970:

October 13–14, 1970: Typhoon Joan (Sening) lashes Luzon and particularly Visayas, killing 770 total.

October 19–21, 1970: Typhoon Kate (Titang) was one of the tropical cyclones closest to form on the equator, makes landfall to Mindanao killing 631 people in total.

November 19–21, 1970: Typhoon Patsy (Yoling) made landfall in Luzon and killed 264 people.

1980s

1980

1981

1982

1983

1984 

August 26–29, 1984: Tropical Storm June (Maring) made landfall in Luzon just days before Typhoon Ike (Nitang) made a more deadly and devastating landfalls.

September 1–4, 1984: Typhoon Ike (Nitang) devastated Visayas, Mindanao and some parts of Southern Luzon, Deaths from the typhoon is 1,474.

October 28–31, 1984: Severe Tropical Storm Warren (Reming) though didn’t make any landfalls, its outflow caused intense rainfall over parts of Visayas, Palawan and Luzon. Killing 69 people.

November 5–7, 1984: Typhoon Agnes (Undang) made several landfalls across Visayas region, killing 895 people.

1985 
June 22, 1985: Typhoon Hal (Kuring) prompted the PAGASA to issue typhoon alerts for much of Luzon, enduring widespread flooding and significant crop damage.
June 28, 1985: Despite the storm remaining well offshore, Typhoon Irma (Daling) dropped heavy rainfall over the eastern portion of the country. Over 30 in (710 mm) of rain fell over parts of Luzon.
July 4–5, 1985: Tropical Depression Elang passes Southern Luzon and Central Visayas.
September 3, 1985: Typhoon Tess (Miling) moved over Luzon, with four being killed due to flooding.
October 11–12, 1985: Tropical Depression Rubing caused rough waves, resulting in 70 fishing boats that sunk or were destroyed in Iloilo.
October 17–18, 1985: Typhoon Dot (Saling) impacted much of Luzon with strong winds and flooding. Nationwide, damage totaled $104.9 million, and the typhoon killed 88 people.
October 25–27, 1985: Tropical Storm Faye (Tasing) brought heavy rainfall over much of Luzon and Visayas.

1986 
July 9, 1986: Typhoon Peggy (Gading) struck northeastern Luzon. Many landslides existed from torrential rainfall, with flooding up to 10 ft (3 m) deep.
August 29–September 3, 1986: Typhoon Wayne (Miding) brought torrential rainfall due to its erratic path.
October 7–8, 1986: Tropical Depression Oyang affects Central Luzon, with total of 16 being killed and damages totalling up to US$4 million.
October 11–13, 1986: Typhoon Ellen (Pasing) affects Visayas and the western coast of Luzon.
October 18, 1986: Tropical Storm Georgia (Ruping) passes by the archipelago of Visayas.
November 7, 1986: Tropical Storm Herbert (Tering) traverses Visayas, bringing light to moderate rainfall.
November 12–13, 1986: Tropical Storm Ida (Uding) passes by Visayas.

1987 
July 11, 1987: Although Typhoon Thelma (Katring) remained well offshore the Philippines, storm surge associated with its circulation swept away some 500 houses in the southern islands of the Philippines, leaving over 3,500 people homeless.
August 11–12, 1987: Typhoon Betty (Herming) struck Visayas as a powerful typhoon, bringing in widespread flooding and severe destruction. Roughly 400,000 people were directly affected by the storm. Overall, 94 people were killed and 324 others were wounded.

August 17–18, 1987: Typhoon Cary (Ising) impacts northern Luzon with rainfall and several landslides. Nationwide, 954 homes were damaged and an additional 89 were destroyed, which resulted in 55,567 people or 13,247 families that either south shelter or were homeless.
September 8–9, 1987: Typhoon Gerald (Neneng) affects the Babuyan Group of Islands, with its outer rain bands bringing torrential rainfall over much of Luzon.
October 24, 1987: Typhoon Lynn (Pepang) traverses the northern coast of Luzon, with most impacts bring experienced in the Cagayan and Ilocos regions. Some landslides were experienced in Benguet.
November 14–15, 1987: Tropical Depression Rosing affects Visayas after passing the archipelago.
November 25, 1987: Typhoon Nina (Sisang) severely impacts the Bicol Region as a Category 5 super typhoon. A total of 90,173 homes were demolished due to Nina while an additional 109,633 were partially destroyed. Overall, damages from the storm totalled $54.5 million and 912 people perished.
December 15–16, 1987: Typhoon Phyllis (Trining) impacts Visayas as a Category 3 typhoon. Only 13 people died from the typhoon.

1988 
January 16, 1988: Typhoon Roy (Asiang) struck the Bicol Region as a Category 1 typhoon and passed through Metro Manila. Low-lying areas in the storm's path were flooded by heavy rains and strong winds downed power lines in Sorsogon.
May 30–June 1, 1988: Typhoon Susan (Biring) brought rainfall over Luzon, which resulted in landslides around Manila, killing 6 people.
June 27, 1988: Tropical Storm Vanessa (Edeng) affected Visayas and Mindanao with rainfall.
July 18, 1988: Typhoon Warren (Huaning) made landfall over the extreme northeastern tip of Luzon as a strong typhoon, prompting flooding that resulted in the suspension of classes.
September 19–20, 1988: Tropical Storm Kit (Maring) brushed the northeastern portion of Luzon.
October 20–21, 1988: Tropical Storm Pat (Toyang) passed through the central portion of Luzon.
October 23–24, 1988: Typhoon Ruby (Unsang) strike the country as a moderately strong typhoon. At the time, it was the strongest typhoon to strike the Philippines in 18 years. At least 110,000 people were left homeless, while nearly 3 million people were affected.
November 2–3, 1988: Tropical Storm Tess (Welpring) affected Visayas, but mostly impacted Palawan. Flash flooding occurred over Calabarzon, Central Visayas and Western Visayas.
November 6–8, 1988: Typhoon Skip (Yoning) impacts Visayas. In all, 237 people died from the typhoon.
December 22–23, 1988: Tropical Storm Val (Apiang) nears the eastern seaboards of the country, bringing light to moderate rainfall.

1989 
January 27–28, 1989: An unnamed tropical depression brings heavy flooding as high as 1.2 m (4 ft) over much of Samar Island. Flooding killed 61 people, with agricultural losses were estimated at $5 million.
May 16–17, 1989: Tropical Storm Brenda (Bining) affects much of Visayas and Luzon with strong winds, resulting in the downing of many trees and power lines. Flooding triggered by the storm prompted officials to evacuate over 5,700 people.

June 6–7, 1989: Tropical Storm Dot (Kuring) produced widespread rainfall over the country, which resulted in several landslides.
July 8, 1989: Tropical Storm Faye (Elang) strikes Northern Luzon.
July 16, 1989: Typhoon Gordon (Goring) made landfall over Cagayan, packing sustained winds estimated at 260 km/h (160 mph). 90 people died from the typhoon.
September 9–10, 1989: Typhoon Sarah (Openg) brought several days of rainfall over Luzon. Two tornadoes were reported in Central Luzon. Roughly 200,000 people remained homeless.
October 5, 1989: Typhoon Angela (Rubing) made landfall over the extreme northern tip of Luzon as a Category 4 super typhoon. It is estimated that 119 people perished, and 192 more were injured.
October 10, 1989: Typhoon Dan (Saling) crossed over much of Southern Luzon. The storm triggered flooding and landslides, while high winds, estimated up to  brought down trees and powerlines.
October 18–19, 1989: Typhoon Elsie (Tasing) batters Luzon as one of the most intense typhoons to hit the country. Only 47 people died from the typhoon.
November 21–22, 1989: Typhoon Hunt (Unsing) traverses Central Luzon. 11 people died from the typhoon, and about 1,500 people were left homeless.

1990s

1990 

June 20–22, 1990: Typhoon Ofelia (Bising) moves off the northeastern coastline of the country, with its outflow and rain bands bringing heavy rainfall. In all, 56 people were killed.
June 25–26, 1990: Typhoon Percy (Klaring) batters Northern Luzon as a strong typhoon. Fortunately, damages remained little.
August 17–18, 1990: Typhoon Yancy (Gading) triggered a monsoon surge by the storm, which resulted in significant rainfall which flooded areas on northern Luzon. A minimum of six people were killed, and over 60,000 people fled to evacuation centers.
August 26, 1990: Typhoon Becky (Heling) moves through extreme portion of northern Luzon, bringing heavy flooding, killing 32 people.
August 28–30, 1990: Typhoon Abe (Iliang) made landfall in Zhejiang, China and its outflow made landslides killing 94 people. 
September 7, 1990: Typhoon Dot (Loleng) mainly affected the Babuyan Group of Islands. However the typhoon pulled the southwest monsoon which brought rainfall over much of Luzon, killing 4 people.
September 15, 1990: Typhoon Ed (Miding), like previous storms, brushed the northern coast of Luzon.
November 12–13, 1990: Typhoon Mike (Ruping) slams Visayas and Mindanao as a severe typhoon. At the time, it was the strongest typhoon to hit the country after 9 years. Over 700 people died from the typhoon.

1991 
March 12–13, 1991: Tropical Storm Sharon (Auring) impacts Caraga and most of Visayas as a weakening system.
April 24–25, 1991: Tropical Depression Bebeng passes over Mindanao and some islands of Visayas.
June 14–15, 1991: Typhoon Yunya (Diding) struck the Philippines during the colossal eruption of Mount Pinatubo of 1991. Although the storm itself caused significant damage, the worst effects were related to the system's heavy rains mixing with volcanic ash from Mount Pinatubo, creating massive lahars that killed 320 people.
July 9–10, 1991: Tropical Depression Etang moved through the Bicol Region and much of Southern Luzon.
July 18, 1991: The passage of Typhoon Amy (Gening) in the Babuyan Group of Islands caused heavy rainfall throughout most of Luzon. Volcanic debris from Mount Pinatubo's slopes loosened by heavy rain destroyed approximately 500 houses throughout the country.
July 22, 1991: Tropical Storm Brendan (Helming) passes over northeastern Luzon, causing rainfall, landslides and mudflows.
October 27–28, 1991: Typhoon Ruth (Trining) impacts the extreme Northern Luzon, killing 12 people.
November 4–5, 1991: Tropical Storm Thelma (Uring) passes over Eastern Visayas and Central Visayas. It was one of the deadliest tropical cyclones in Philippine history, killing at least 5,081 people.
November 13, 1991: Tropical Storm Seth (Warling) affects the northern coastline of Luzon.
November 16–17, 1991: Tropical Storm Wilda (Yayang) traverses the Bicol Region and Southern Luzon.

1992 
July 10, 1992: Typhoon Eli (Konsing) traverses Central Luzon as a Category 1 typhoon. Only four people will killed. Offshore, 10 ships sunk. Moreover, torrential rains associated with the typhoon alleviated drought conditions.
July 20, 1992: Tropical Depression Ditang briefly passes Luzon. Light to moderate rainfall was associated from the storm.
September 21, 1992: Tropical Storm Ted (Maring) stalls and re-curves off the northern coast of Luzon, only affecting Batanes and nearby islands with rainfall.
October 21–22, 1992: Tropical Storm Colleen (Paring) traverses Central Luzon, bringing heavy rainfall and flooding.

1993 
February 28–March 1, 1993: Tropical Depression Atring made landfall over eastern Mindanao. Heavy rainfall was experienced for most of the southern half of the country.
April 12, 1993: Tropical Depression Bining affects Mindanao with light rainfall.
June 19, 1993: Tropical Depression Elang traverses Southern Luzon.
June 25–26, 1993: Typhoon Koryn (Goring) batters Northern Luzon. The typhoon caused landslides that left around 30 people dead, injuring 109 others and left $14 million (1993 USD) in damage. The Philippine government declared 16 provinces disaster areas after the storm.
July 8, 1993: Tropical Storm Lewis (Huling) affects Southern Luzon, Bicol Region and Eastern Visayas.
August 18–19, 1993: Tropical Storm Tasha (Rubing) moves over the northern islands of the country, with its outflow bringing heavy rainfall throughout most of the country.
August 23, 1993:  Tropical Storm Winona (Saling) passes through Visayas.
September 15, 1993: Tropical Storm Becky (Yeyeng) moves off the northern coast of the country.
October 3–4, 1993: Typhoon Flo (Kadiang) brings heavy flooding over Luzon, resulting in 430 deaths.
October 31–November 1, 1993: Typhoon Ira (Husing) impacts Central Luzon as a strong typhoon.
November 21, 1993: Tropical Storm Kyle (Luring) passes through Visayas.
December 5, 1993: Typhoon Lola (Monang) impacts much of Southern Luzon with heavy rainfall. Flash flooding and landslides killed about 230 people.
December 9–10, 1993: Typhoon Manny (Naning) impacts much of Visayas and Southern Luzon as a strong typhoon.
December 15, 1993: Tropical Depression Oning brings light rainfall over Eastern Visayas and Central Visayas.
December 25–26, 1993: Tropical Storm Nell (Puring) affects both Visayas and Mindanao.

1994 
January 5, 1994: Tropical Depression Akang made landfall over Eastern Samar. Around 40 deaths were reported due to the storm, with damages of about Php70 million (US$2.4 million) in damage reported.
April 3–5, 1994: Tropical Storm Owen (Bising) made landfall between Leyte and Mindanao. The impact from the storm caused a state of calamity to be declared in nine provinces.
May 24, 1994: Tropical Depression Deling traverses Visayas, bringing moderate to heavy rainfall. Heavy flooding killed five people and left one person missing.
June 22, 1994: Tropical Depression Gading moved over much of Southern Luzon, where mudflows were seen over Mount Pinatubo.
July 9–10, 1994: The combined impacts of Typhoon Tim (Iliang) and Tropical Storm Vanessa (Loleng) caused widespread heavy rainfall over much of Luzon and Western Visayas.
July 18, 1994: Tropical Storm Yunya (Norming) moves over the northern coast of Luzon. Gusts were in excess of 60 knots (110 km/h) across Luzon.
September 10–11, 1994: Tropical Storm Luke (Weling) moves over the extreme northern coastline of Luzon.
October 21, 1994: Typhoon Teresa (Katring) impacted much of the lower half of Luzon, which most impacts located over the Calabarzon region.
December 21–22, 1994: Typhoon Axel (Garding) impacts the Visayas archipelago. 19 people perished from the typhoon.

1995 
June 1–2, 1995: Tropical Storm Deanna (Auring) affects Visayas and the western provinces of Luzon.
July 28, 1995: Tropical Depression 06W affects the eastern portion of Luzon such as the provinces of Cagayan and Isabela. PAGASA never tracked the storm.
August 9, 1995: Tropical Storm Helen (Karing) passes close to the coast of extreme Northern Luzon.
August 29, 1995: Typhoon Kent (Gening) brushed the Philippine island of Basco in Batanes. Five people died in Luzon and over 178,000 people were affected by flash flooding. The heavy rainfall also caused mudslides that flowed down the sides of Mount Pinatubo that buried small villages.

September 4–5, 1995: Tropical Storm Nina (Helming) affected and passed over Northern Luzon as a minimal storm.
September 22, 1995: Typhoon Ryan (Luding) briefly passes over the Babuyan Group of Islands.
September 29–30, 1995: Tropical Storm Sibyl (Mameng) affects Eastern Visayas, Metro Manila and much of Luzon. As a result, from the storm's effect, 108 people died and caused US$38.5 million in damages.
October 23–24, 1995: Tropical Storm Yvette (Oniang) traverses Southern Luzon with light to moderate rainfall.
October 29, 1995: Typhoon Zack (Pepang) crosses over much of Visayas, but no known deaths or damages were reported.
November 2–3, 1995: Typhoon Angela (Rosing) impacts the Bicol Region, much of Southern Luzon and Metro Manila as a Category 5 super typhoon. It was the strongest to hit the country in 25 years at the time. 882 people were found dead, and damages toppled up Php9.33 billion (US$315 million).
December 4–5, 1995: Tropical Depression Sendang brings heavy rainfall over much of the Bicol Region, killing 14 people.

1996 
March 1, 1996: Tropical Depression Asiang affects Central Visayas and Northern Mindanao with light to moderate rainfall.
April 7–8, 1996: Tropical Storm Ann (Biring) traverses much of Visayas with rainfall and landslides. Casualties and damages remain unknown.
May 23, 1996: Tropical Storm Cam (Ditang) passes through the Babuyan Group of Islands.
July 24, 1996: Typhoon Gloria (Gloring) brushed the northern coast of the Philippines without making landfall. 20 people were dead from the typhoon.
August 19–20, 1996: Tropical Storm Niki (Lusing) made landfall over Cagayan Valley. Heavy rainfall occurred over much of Northern Luzon.
September 7, 1996: Typhoon Sally (Maring), as a Category 5 super typhoon, passes the coast of extreme Northern Luzon. Flash flooding and strong winds were reported, but damages and casualties remain unknown.
October 11, 1996: Tropical Depression Reming passes Luzon, killing 8 people and 7 people missing. Damages were up to only US$4.3 million.
October 18, 1996: Tropical Storm Beth (Seniang) impacted the northeastern portion of Cagayan. One person drowned in the province of Ifugao.
November 6–8, 1996: Tropical Storm Ernie (Toyang) brings heavy rainfall throughout most of the country. The stor, killed 24 people, left 12 others missing and caused US$5.1 million in damages.

1997 
May 26, 1997: Tropical Depression Bining affects most of Luzon bringing heavy to torrential rainfall.
August 27–28, 1997: Typhoon Amber (Miling) affects Cagayan and Batanes with rainfall and gusty winds.
October 20, 1997: Typhoon Ivan (Narsing) made landfall over Northern Luzon, producing torrential rains that triggered waist-deep floods. 14 people were killed by the typhoon.
October 29–31, 1997: The precursor low-pressure area which would become Tropical Depression Openg traversed Visayas, producing heavy rainfall that killed two people.
November 15–16, 1997: Tropical Storm Mort (Pining) brought locally heavy rainfall to areas of northern Luzon, resulting in minor flooding.

1998 

August 3, 1998: Typhoon Otto (Bising) affected Batanes and the Babuyan Group of Islands, dumping heavy rainfall across Northern Luzon.
August 7–8, 1998: Tropical Storm Penny (Klaring) made landfall in  Cagayan.
September 18–19, 1998: Typhoon Vicki (Gading) made landfall over in the Ilocos Region. The storm was known to sink the ferry MV Princess of the Orient during the onslaught of the typhoon, killing 70 and leaving 80 others missing and presumed dead.
October 13–14, 1998: Typhoon Zeb (Iliang) struck the Cagayan Province as a Category 5 super typhoon. The typhoon dropped torrential rainfall in Luzon, reaching  in one day in La Trinidad, estimated as a one-in-1,147-year event. 83 people died from the typhoon due to flooding, landslides or gusty winds.
October 21–23, 1998: Typhoon Babs (Loleng) moved offshore as a Category 4 super typhoon, with the most impacts in Cagayan and the Bicol Region. 303 people died from the typhoon while 751 were injured.
December 10–11, 1998: Typhoon Faith (Norming) traverses Visayas as a weak typhoon. The PAGASA issued a Tropical Cyclone Warning Signal No. 3 over in Eastern Samar and Central Visayas. 33 people died from the typhoon.
December 17–18, 1998: An unnamed tropical depression developed to the north of Central Visayas and traversed northward, affecting much of Southern Luzon with heavy rainfall.

1999 
April 9, 1999: Tropical Depression Karing made landfall over the Bicol Region. The rainfall from the system ranged from 80 mm (3 inches) up to 400 mm (16 inches) in some places in the Philippines, but only minor damage was recorded on land.
April 22, 1999: Tropical Storm Kate (Diding) persisted in the eastern coast of Eastern Samar. The system brought torrential rain to the eastern and central portion of the Philippines, with amounts as high as  falling in places.
June 4–5, 1999: The outflow of Typhoon Maggie (Etang) brought heavy rainfall across Luzon and the upper portion of Visayas.
August 18–19, 1999: Tropical Storm Sam (Luding) impacted the northern portion of Luzon. Landslides occurred the most in Baguio.
September 1–3, 1999: Tropical Storm Wendy (Mameng) brought rainfall across Luzon.
September 10–11, 1999: Tropical Depression Neneng brought heavy showers of up to 400 mm (16 inches), which caused some flooding in the Cagayan Valley, where 18 people died.
October 6, 1999: Typhoon Dan (Pepang) battered the extreme northern Luzon as a Category 3 typhoon, which brought torrential rainfall and rough waves.
November 8–9, 1999: Tropical Depression Frankie (Sendang) brought heavy rain of up to 300 mm (12 inches) over Visayas.

Climatology

Deadly storms 
The following list are the twelve most deadly storms that impacted the Philippines between 1963 and 1999. This list only includes typhoons that had death tolls exceeding 300. Only two out of the twelve exceeded death numbers above 1,000. Total number of deaths recorded are only from the country itself.

See also 

Typhoon
Typhoons in the Philippines
List of typhoons in the Philippines (2000–present)
 Pacific typhoon season

References 

+
Lists of events in the Philippines
Philippines